Lyces gopala is a moth of the family Notodontidae first described by Paul Dognin in 1891. It is endemic to the state of Mérida in the mountains of western Venezuela.

The larvae feed on Passiflora species, including Passiflora cuneata and Passiflora gritensis.

External links
Species page at Tree of Life Web Project

Notodontidae
Moths described in 1891